Radovan Ničić (born 1971) was the first President of the Assembly of the Community and Municipalities of the Autonomous Province of Kosovo and Metohija since 28 June 2008. He was also the de jure Mayor of Pristina (seat in Gračanica), elected during the 2008 Kosovan local elections.

References

1971 births
Living people
Serbian politicians
Mayors of Pristina
Place of birth missing (living people)
Date of birth missing (living people)